Common Ground: Dave & Phil Alvin Play and Sing the Songs of Big Bill Broonzy is a studio album by rock musicians Dave and Phil Alvin, released in 2014. The album is a tribute to the songs of Big Bill Broonzy; the brothers credit him with writing the first rockabilly song.

The album peaked at No. 144 on the Billboard 200. It was nominated for a Grammy, in the "Best Blues Album" category.

Reception
AllMusic critic Mark Deming wrote: "While listening to this is a potent reminder of how good Broonzy's songs still sound in the 21st century, it also demonstrates the complementary talents of Dave and Phil Alvin... It's clear the Alvins love this music and know how to mess with it in just the right way, and they don't treat Broonzy's tales of all manner of wild living like museum pieces, but as vital, living bits of American music, and that's how they sound on this album." The New Yorker wrote that "the Alvins have picked a dozen songs that reflect the wide range of Broonzy’s material, from early highlights, like 'Saturday Night Rub', to mature classics, like 'Key to the Highway'. Both brothers sing and play guitar, and both shine."

Track listing
All songs by Big Bill Broonzy unless otherwise noted.
"All By Myself" – 3:28
"I Feel So Good" – 4:09
"How Do You Want It Done?" – 3:00	
"Southern Flood Blues" – 4:29
"Big Bill Blues" – 3:19	
"Key to the Highway" (William Broonzy, Charlie Segar) – 3:48	
"Tomorrow" – 3:21	
"Just a Dream" – 3:52
"You've Changed" – 3:12	
"Stuff They Call Money" – 4:44
"Truckin' Little Woman" – 3:08
"Saturday Night Rub" – 2:08

Personnel
Dave Alvin – vocals, guitar, National Steel guitar
Phil Alvin – vocals, guitar, harmonica
Bob Glaub – bass
Brad Fordham – bass, acoustic bass
Don Heffington – drums
Lisa Pankratz – drums
Gene Taylor – piano

Production notes
Dave Alvin – producer, liner notes
Craig Parker Adams – engineer, mixing, producer
Joe Gastwirt – mastering
Michael Triplett – design
Harry Sabin – photo assistance
Cass Alvin – cover photo
Beth Herzhaft – photography

References

2014 albums
Yep Roc Records albums
Dave Alvin albums